Khoh is a historical region of Rajasthan state in western India. Which was located just five miles to the east of Jaipur city and was ruled by the Chanda clan. Colonel James Tod wrote it as Khogong in his book Annals and Antiquities of Rajasthan.

Rao Chandrasen Chanda abandoned Mahishmati city and established a kingdom here.

History 

Khoh has been the historical capital of Dhundhar, which was ruled by the Chanda clan of Meenas. Dulha, the last ruler of the Kachchhapaghata dynasty, attacked it and defeated the Chandas. Dulha shifted his capital here from Dausa, which was later changed to Amber by Kakil Deo.

List of rulers

The list of rulers and titular rulers are as follows:

Rulers 

 Rao Chandrasen
 Rao Budhsen
 Mahasen
 Bhurpal
 Devpal 
 Rao Bijal
 Rao Balansi
 Rao Uvaran
 Rao Bhupal
 Kishanpal
 Rao Pitha
 Rao Jorasi
 Rao Manik
 Rao Jaichand
 Sodhdev
 Abaychand
 Ran Rao
 Gono Rao
 Satno Rao
 Rao sreedar
 Rao sulpan
 Rao Alansi

Other rulers 

 Dulherai
 Kakil Deo

Sources

References 

History of Rajasthan